Hwangseong-dong may refer to:

Hwangseong-dong, Gyeongju
Hwangseong-dong, Ulsan